Paranath or Parasnath Avtar is a composition, within Rudra Avtar, written by Guru Gobind Singh, which is present in Dasam Granth. There are 358 Channds. The composition is about the life history of Parasnath and his discourse with Matsyendranath. The composition is succeeded with Sabad Patshahi 10. Unlike Chandi Charitar and Krishna Avtar, the source of narration of Parasnath Avtar is not any of the 36 Puranas. This narration is most likely about the 23rd Tirthankara, Parshwanath of Jainism. As the narration is about internal struggle, which resembles with Jainism.

Internal Struggle
This composition contains an internal contest between Bibek (or discernment) and Abibek (or ignorance), which explains the warriors of Dharma and Adharma. All vices and virtues are shown in the form of warriors which fight in battle.

References

Dasam Granth